XV or Xv may refer to:

Arts and entertainment:
 XV (rapper) (born 1985), rapper from Wichita, Kansas, United States
 XV (King's X album), 2008
 XV (TVXQ album), 2019
 XV (EP), by the Jonas Brothers (2020)

Science and technology:
 xv (software), a shareware image display and manipulation program for Unix
 Subaru XV, a compact SUV
 X video extension, an extension to the X Window System

Other uses:
 15 (number), in Roman numerals
 Air Vietnam (IATA code XV)